Daniel Neuner (born 25 October 1987 in Garmisch-Partenkirchen, West Germany) is a German male curler. He has represented Germany at several international championships, including at two World Junior Championships and a World Men's Championship.

Curling career 
As a junior Neuner skipped Team Germany in back-to-back years at the World Junior Championships, in 2007 and 2008. His teams finished 8th and 6th, respectively.

Neuner competed in his first European Men's Curling Championship in 2012 as lead for skip Andreas Lang. The team also included third Daniel Herberg (a two-time Olympian), second Markus Messenzehl, and Andreas Kempf as alternate. The tournament went poorly for Team Germany, their only win coming over Hungary's György Nagy. Their 1-8 record put them at 9th out of the 10 teams in the Group A competition and meant Germany was relegated to Group B of the 2013 European Curling Championships.

Later in the season the same team competed in the 2013 German Men's Curling Championship, though without Lang at skip. With Lang out the rest of the team were promoted a position, with Herberg skipping, Messenzehl as third, Neuner as second, and former alternate Kempf as lead. The team finished with a 4-2 record, good enough for the silver medal behind John Jahr. The next year Neuner returned to the German Championship with a different team, throwing third for skip Konstantin Kampf. Despite the different team the result was the same for Neuner, another silver medal to John Jahr's gold.

For the 2018 European Championships Neuner played as second for skip Marc Muskatewitz. The team just missed getting a medal, losing the bronze medal match to Italy's Joël Retornaz 6-8. Later in the same season Neuner played with Muskatewitz again, this time as third at the 2019 World Men's Championship. It was Neuner's first World Men's Championship and they finished in 8th place, Germany's best finish since 2014.

Personal life 
Neuner started curling around the age of 15. He attended the Ludwig Maximilian University of Munich.

Teams

References

External links 
 

Living people
1987 births
German male curlers
Sportspeople from Garmisch-Partenkirchen
21st-century German people